Staincross was a Wapentake (Hundred), which is an administrative division (or ancient district), in the historic county of the West Riding of Yorkshire. It consisted of seven parishes, and included the towns of Barnsley and Penistone

History
Staincross was named after the village of Staincross and also included the parishes of Cawthorne, Darton, Felkirk, Hemsworth, High Hoyland, Penistone, Royston, Silkstone (including Barnsley) and Tankersley and parts of Darfield. Of the nine wapentakes in the West Riding of Yorkshire, Staincross typically had the lowest population density, which was recorded in 1867 as 27,089.

The original meeting place of the wapentake is believed to have been in, or near, to the village of Staincross, similar to the wapentakes at Ewcross and Osgoldcross. The name derives from the Old Norse of stein-kross, literally, stone cross.

Originally located in the West Riding of Yorkshire, the majority of area within Staincross Wapentake is now within South Yorkshire, with Hemsworth and surrounding villages today a part of the Wakefield Metropolitan District, within West Yorkshire. The original boundaries nestled against the wapentakes of Agbrigg to the north, Osgoldcross to the east and Strafforth to the south and south east. On the western edge, the wapentake bordered the Hamestan Hundred of Cheshire.

Although some distance from the village of Staincross, the Church of All Saints, Silkstone, was sometimes known as the "Mother Church" of the Staincross Wapentake.

Notes

References

Wapentakes of the West Riding of Yorkshire